Calix may refer to:

 Calix Inc., telecommunications equipment company
 Calix Limited, research company
 Calix Society, counselling organisation

People with the surname
 François-Claudius Compte-Calix, painter
 Luis Cálix (footballer, born 1965), Honduran football midfielder
 Luis Cálix (soccer, born 1988), American soccer defender and son of the Honduran footballer
 Mira Calix, musician

See also
 Calyx (disambiguation)
Kalix, a place in Sweden